Charles Sidney Bradford Fraley (September 8, 1878 – January 14, 1942) was an American fencer. He competed in the team sabre event at the 1920 Summer Olympics. He committed suicide by shooting himself in 1942.

References

External links
 

1878 births
1942 suicides
American male sabre fencers
Olympic fencers of the United States
Fencers at the 1920 Summer Olympics
Fencers from Philadelphia
Suicides by firearm in Pennsylvania
Suicides in Philadelphia